Dan Kemp may refer to:

Dan Kemp (footballer), English footballer for Hartlepool United
John Dan Kemp, American lawyer
Daniel S. Kemp, American organic chemist